Santorini 2020 Football Club is a Greek football club based in Santorini, Cyclades, Greece.

History
The club was established in 2020, after the merger of five teams of Santorini island Panthiraikos, Thyella Kamari, A.O. Pyrgos, A.O. Lava Emporio and A.O. Karterados.

References

External links
Official Website 

Santorini
Cyclades
Football clubs in South Aegean
Association football clubs established in 2020
2020 establishments in Greece
Gamma Ethniki clubs